Lists of elephants include:

List of elephantids
List of elephants in mythology and religion
List of individual elephants
List of fictional pachyderms

 
Lists of placental mammals